The Frisky Mrs. Johnson is a 1920 silent film comedy starring Billie Burke. It was produced by Famous Players-Lasky and distributed through Paramount Pictures. It is based on a 1903 Broadway stage play by Clyde Fitch. On the stage Burke's part was played by Amelia Bingham.  Burke's next to last silent film. It is a lost film.

Plot
As summarized in a film publication, Mrs. Belle Johnson (Burke) is a widow and has a married sister Grace Morley (Warrington) who is unhappy and is having an affair with Sir Lionel Heathcote (Gordon). Belle tries to keep them apart to save her sister's reputation. Frank Morley (Hare), a brother of Grace's husband and a previous love of Belle, returns and soon he and Belle are in love again and planning to elope. At the same time Grace is planning on running off with Heathcote, and a note sent to her is found by her husband Jim (Crane). Jim follows his wife Grace to Heathcote's apartment, but Belle gets there ahead of them and pretends that the note was meant for her. Franks hears of this and wants nothing more with Belle. Eventually, Grace decides that she cannot let her sister sacrifice her happiness and tells her husband the truth. Frank goes back with Belle, and Grace says that she is getting a divorce so that she can marry Heathcote.

Cast
Billie Burke - Belle Johnson
Ward Crane - Jim Morley
Jane Warrington - Grace Morley
Lumsden Hare - Frank Morley
Huntley Gordon - Sir Lionel Heathcote
Jean De Briac - Max Dendeau
Robert Agnew - Lal Birkenread
Leonora von Ottinger - Mrs. Birkenread
Emily Fitzroy - Mrs. Chardley

References

External links

1920 films
American silent feature films
Films directed by Edward Dillon
American films based on plays
Lost American films
Famous Players-Lasky films
1920 comedy films
Silent American comedy films
American black-and-white films
1920 lost films
Lost comedy films
1920s American films